Staromusyatovo (İśke Mösät) is a rural locality (a village) in Starosubkhangulovsky Selsoviet, Burzyansky District, Bashkortostan, Russia. The population was 268 as of 2010. There are 12 streets.

Geography 
Staromusyatovo is located 8 km north of Starosubkhangulovo (the district's administrative centre) by road. Novosubkhangulovo is the nearest rural locality.

References 

Rural localities in Burzyansky District